Torrance James Marshall (born June 12, 1977) is a former professional American football player.  He played high school football at Miami Sunset Senior High. He played college football at the University of Oklahoma and was the MVP of the 2001 Orange Bowl. In the past, he has played in the National Football League, primarily as a linebacker for the Green Bay Packers. He is the nephew of former NFL player Harvey Clayton.

College 
Marshall intended to spend his college playing career with the University of Miami, but was not accepted due to academic reasons. Instead, he attended Kemper Military School, where he had a total of 198 tackles, and later Miami-Dade Community College. In 1999, he began attending the University of Oklahoma as a criminal justice major, and was co-captain of his football team for two consecutive seasons. He was a third-team All-American as a senior and finished second on the team in total tackles. He was named MVP of the 2001 Orange Bowl where the Sooners defeated the Florida State Seminoles to win the national championship for the 2000 season.  He was also named MVP of the Senior Bowl.

NFL career 
Marshall was drafted with the 72nd overall selection in the 2001 NFL Draft by the Green Bay Packers in the third round. He spent most of his rookie season as a backup player as well as on special teams, totaling twenty tackles. He made his first start against the Tennessee Titans that season, replacing the injured Nate Wayne. During the 2002 season, he began seeing action at fullback as well as linebacker when starter William Henderson was battling injuries. He totaled twenty-one tackles on special teams that season.

Marshall was suspended for the first four games of the 2003 season but rebounded to post twenty-three tackles that season. He began the season again as a backup in 2004 but was placed on injured reserve that season and was released at the end of the season.

Arena Football League
After taking the 2005 season off, Marshall joined the Austin Wranglers of the Arena Football League as a fullback/linebacker. In his first season, he scored three touchdowns out of eighteen rushing attempts and made twenty solo tackles. He then signed with the Tampa Bay Storm, where he set a franchise single-season rushing touchdown mark with 17 touchdowns on the ground.

See also
 List of Arena Football League and National Football League players

References

External links 
Tampa Bay Storm's player page
 AFL Stats

1977 births
Living people
Miami Sunset Senior High School alumni
Players of American football from Miami
American football linebackers
American football fullbacks
Miami Dade College alumni
Oklahoma Sooners football players
Green Bay Packers players
Austin Wranglers players
Tampa Bay Storm players